Chondroyannos or Chondrogiannis (Greek: Χονδρόγιαννος, Χονδρογιάννης) is a Hellenic or Greek patronymic surname; Chondro (Greek: Χονδρός) for fat and Yannos a derivative of the forename Giannis (Greek: Γιάννης) or John. The prefix 'Chondro' is seen combined with other common forenames to form multiple Greek surnames, i.e. Chondrogiorgos, Chondronikolas ...

Chondroyannos is a family name of lineage most commonly associated to members of the Greek diaspora from the Dodecanese region of Greece. Prior to taking root in the Dodecanese, family members resided in Asia Minor (present day, western coastal Turkey) for what is believed to have been centuries before a massive population exchange between Greece and Turkey; which took place in the early 20th century. In accordance with the stipulations of the Treaty of Lausanne, the Chondroyannos family along with an estimated 1.500.000 million Greeks were forcibly placed within the area of Greece's then newly defined boundary. Later in the same century, only a small number from the clan established themselves in communities outside Greece (Canada and the United States of America are known). The surname was transliterated during the family's migration from Greece to produce the Latin phonetic spelling. The original Greek name is known to be shared by Hellenes in other regions of Greek society.

When translating, today's Hellenes of Greece and the European Community who hold the surname Chondroyannos more commonly spell the name using a shallow orthographic method, relating each Greek letter to a corresponding letter in the Latin alphabet. This literal translation of the surname Chondroyannos thus becomes, Hondrogiannos or Hondrogiannis.

Origins and tradition 

The Chondroyannos surname is believed to have been incorporated during the period of Ottoman rule in Greece (14th to 19th centuries). As is often dictated by Greek custom, the forenames of family members are passed on from preceding generations. Additionally, traditional Greek Orthodox/Christian forenames are common within the Chondroyannos lineage.

Notable people 
Giannis Chondrogiannis (1761-1835), Greek politician and revolutionary leader

See also 

Greek American
Greek Canadians
Greek name
Ottoman Greece
Population exchange between Greece and Turkey

External links 
 Citizenship and Immigration Canada
 EUROPA - Gateway to the European Union
 Ministry of Foreign Affairs (Greece)
 U.S. Citizenship and Immigration Services

Greek-language surnames
Surnames